Lebrun, LeBrun, or Le Brun is a surname and a given name. Notable people with the name include:

Surname
 Albert Lebrun (1879–1950), French politician and President of France
 Céline Lebrun (born 1976), French judoka
 Charles Le Brun (1619–1690), French painter
 Charles-François Lebrun (1739–1824), 1st duc de Plaisance, French statesman
 Christopher Le Brun (born 1951), British artist, primarily a painter
 Claude LeBrun (born 1956), American mathematician
 Élisabeth Vigée Le Brun (1755–1842), French painter
 Eugénie Le Brun (died 1908), French-born Egyptian feminist intellectual and salon host
 Francesca Lebrun (1756–1791), German singer and composer
 Fromund Le Brun (died 1283), cleric and judge in Ireland and Lord Chancellor of Ireland
 Garin lo Brun or le Brun (died 1156/1162), French troubadour
 Jean Lebrun (born 1950), French journalist and radio producer
 Jean-Baptiste-Pierre Lebrun (1748–1813), French painter, art collector and art dealer
 Julie Le Brun (1780–1819), French painter and frequent model for her mother, Élisabeth Vigée Le Brun
 Louis-Sébastien Lebrun (1764–1829), French opera composer and tenor
 Ludwig August Lebrun (1752–1790), German composer and oboist
 Maurice le Brun, 1st Baron Brun (before 1279–1354/1355), English baron
 Napoleon LeBrun (1821–1901), American architect
 Pierre-Antoine Lebrun (1785–1873), French poet
 Ponce Denis Écouchard Lebrun (1729–1807), French lyric poet
 Rico Lebrun (1900-1964), Italian artist

Given name
 Lebrun Constantine (1874–1942) West Indian cricketer

See also
 Lebrón, given name and surname